"Just Remember I Love You" is a song by American rock band Firefall from their album, Luna Sea (1977), with backing vocals by Timothy B. Schmit. It was written by Rick Roberts and released as a single on July 21, 1977.

"Just Remember I Love You" peaked at number 11 on the US Billboard Hot 100, spent two weeks at number nine on Cashbox, and reached number one on the US Easy Listening chart. The song also reached number one on the Canadian Adult Contemporary chart.

Track listings
7" single   

 "Just Remember I Love You" – 3:14
 "Just Think" - 4:11

Chart performance

Weekly charts

Year-end charts

See also
List of number-one adult contemporary singles of 1977 (U.S.)

References

1977 singles
Firefall songs
1976 songs
Atlantic Records singles
Barry Manilow songs